Lev Stepanovich Igorev (Russian: Лев Степанович Игорев; 10 February 1821, in Komarovka, Saratov Governorate – 29 December 1893, in Saratov) was a Russian portrait painter in the Academic style.

Biography 
His father was the sexton at a small church. He attended a religious school in Petrovsk then, in 1838, he and his brother Sergei entered the Saratov Theological Seminary; graduating in 1844. During his stay, he made drawings of several church officials, including Bishop Yakov, who became his patron.

He was initially assigned to the village of Rudno in Kamyshinsky District, but the portraits he had done at the seminary made him interested in pursuing formal studies in art, so he applied to the Saint Petersburg Theological Academy for lessons that would enable him to become an art teacher at a religious school. 

While there, he also audited classes at the Imperial Academy of Arts and his work won praise from Fyodor Tolstoy. In 1850, he was awarded the title of "Artist" and, in 1853, was named an Academician for his portrait of Macarius Bulgakov.  In 1855, he became a teacher at the Theological Academy. At that time, he created icons for numerous churches in rural districts, as well as Saint Petersburg. He also created a medallion with the image of Mary for presentation to the Tsarina, Maria Alexandrovna.

Mission to China
After less than two years as a teacher, he volunteered for the fourteenth Russian Spiritual Mission to Beijing and, in 1857, became the mission's official artist. The mission was delayed by events related to the Taiping Rebellion, so he spent a year in Irkutsk.

While in Beijing, his primary mission was replacing Albazinian icons that had been destroyed in 1685 by the Qing Army (and were destroyed again during the Cultural Revolution). In 1863, he was charged with delivering a diplomatic message to Admiral Popov in Shanghai.

Upon returning to Saint Petersburg in 1864, he mounted a major exhibition at the Academy, with genre scenes and portraits of Chinese officials and their families. He was also  awarded the Order of Saint Stanislaus. Following that, he worked primarily as an icon painter, working in Kostroma, Novgorod, Vologda and Arzamas. In 1885, he did most of the decorative work for the newly rebuilt Church of the Intercession in Saratov. In 1890, he went to live there with his widowed sisters and wrote his memoirs. He died of paralysis after several trips to the village of Sleptsovka to make funeral arrangements for another sister.

Most of his church works were destroyed during the Soviet period. The current locations of all but two of the works he painted in China are unknown. In 1950, an unfinished posthumous portrait of Alexander Griboyedov was identified as his.

References

External links 

1821 births
1893 deaths
People from Kuznetsky Uyezd (Saratov Governorate)
19th-century painters from the Russian Empire
Russian male painters
Russian portrait painters
Russian Christian missionaries
Eastern Orthodox missionaries
Russian expatriates in China
Christian missionaries in China
Recipients of the Order of Saint Stanislaus (Russian)